Sara West is an Australian actress.

Filmography

Film

Television

References

External links

Australian film actresses
Living people
Year of birth missing (living people)